The Sea Chase is a 1955 World War II drama film starring John Wayne and Lana Turner, and featuring David Farrar, Lyle Bettger, and Tab Hunter. It was directed by John Farrow from a screenplay by James Warner Bellah and John Twist based on the novel of the same name by Andrew Geer. The plot is a nautical cat and mouse adventure, with Wayne determined to get his freighter home to Germany during the opening months of World War II, chased relentlessly across the Pacific then Atlantic oceans by the Australian and then British navies.

The film was shot in CinemaScope and WarnerColor.

Plot
Captain Karl Ehrlich (John Wayne) is the master of the aging German steam freighter Ergenstrasse, home port Hamburg, docked at Sydney, Australia, on the eve of the Second World War. Ehrlich is a former German Navy officer who lost his command after refusing to support the Nazi regime. As his ship prepares for sea to avoid internment, Erlich meets with an old friend, British Royal Navy Commander Jeff Napier (David Farrar), plus Napier's German fiancée Elsa Keller (Lana Turner). Ehrlich knows Elsa has a dubious past and tries to break them up by reminding Elsa of her past trysts, to which she chuckles and smiles. 

With war imminent because Germany has invaded Poland, the Ergenstrasse prepares to slip away. The German Consul-General asks Ehrlich to transport an Abwehr spy who risks capture. It is only leaving Sydney, in thick fog during night, that Ehrlich discovers the spy is Elsa, who had seduced Napier and drawn out military information from him. Elsa is cynically dismissive of Ehrlich's personal integrity. Ehrlich's chief officer, the pro-Nazi Kirchner (Lyle Bettger), who is also with German intelligence, soon makes advances on Elsa. Erlich intervenes and stymies Kirchner’s overtures towards Elsa. 

Old, slow and short on coal, the Ergenstrasse is seen as easy prey by the Royal Australian Navy and by Napier in particular, who understandably holds a grudge. The wily Ehrlich leads his enemies on a chase across the Pacific Ocean, pausing only briefly for supplies at an unmanned rescue station on Auckland Island. Three fishermen are already marooned there, but Kirchner casually murders them and takes most of their supplies. He tells no one. The pursuing Napier discovers the bodies and, believing his old friend is responsible, vows to bring Ehrlich to justice as a war criminal.

Ehrlich, meanwhile, sets course for the remote, uninhabited Pacific island of Pom Pom Galli in the Tuamotus. Running out of coal, Ehrlich begins burning wood from the ship for fuel, upsetting crew when the lifeboats are burned. A potential mutiny is averted as they reach the island. While Ehrlich drives the crew to harvest timber there for fuel, he impresses Elsa with his humane side. Discovering that Kirchner murdered the fishermen, an angry Ehrlich forces him to sign an account of his actions in the ship's log. Then Erlich punches Kirchner in the mouth, drawing blood and knocking his hair askew. 

Napier finally convinces the Rockhamptons captain that Ehrlich will be at Pom Pom Galli, but they arrive too late. Both ships make for Valparaíso in neutral Chile, where Napier cannot attack. In port, a frustrated Napier confronts Ehrlich about the murders, slapping Erlich and calling him a murderer and coward. Ehrlich says that if they catch the Ergenstrasse they can read the truth in his log. Meanwhile Elsa learns the truth herself, distances herself from Kirchner, and declares her love for Ehrlich. They share the captain’s cabin for the remainder of the voyage. 

Luck is with the Ergenstrasse when the Rockhampton is called away to support cruisers facing the German pocket battleship Graf Spee in Montevideo, Uruguay. Napier requests a transfer to the British naval patrols in the North Sea, believing that Ehrlich must pass that way in his attempt to reach Kiel. Napier flies to England as the Ergenstrasse, resupplied with coal and lifeboats, departs for Germany.

For political reasons, German radio broadcasts a message through Lord Haw-Haw disclosing the Ergenstrasse's position near Norway, thus exposing the ship to the Royal Navy and the prowling Napier, now commanding a corvette. Napier tracks down Ehrlich's ship and sinks it in the North Sea. Ehrlich orders the crew to evacuate and take the ship's log. Then, instead of the swastika-flag of the Third Reich, Ehrlich hoists the battle flag of the Imperial German Navy, in which he had been an officer aboard the SMS Moltke at the Battle of Jutland. Only he, Elsa, and an unwilling Kirchner remain aboard for a short, one-sided battle, during which Erlich and Kirchner get into another fight and Elsa embraces Erlich as the Ergenstrasse is bombarded. Their fate is unclear but the other crewmen hand over the log, proving to Napier that Kirchner committed the murders alone. A recent discovery of the film’s script suggests an alternate ending in which Kirchner drowns and Erlich and Elsa are rescued only to be thrown overboard on Napier’s orders after he discovers that Elsa has been unfaithful to him with Erlich.

Cast

 John Wayne as Captain Karl Ehrlich
 Lana Turner as Elsa Keller
 David Farrar as Lieutenant Commander Jeff Napier RN
 Lyle Bettger as Chief Officer Kirchner
 Tab Hunter as Cadet Wesser
 James Arness as Schleiter
 Dick Davalos as Cadet Walter Stemme
 John Qualen as Chief Engineer Schmitt
 Paul Fix as Max Heinz

 Lowell Gilmore as Captain Evans
 Luis Van Rooten as Matz
 Alan Hale as Wentz
 Wilton Graff as Consul-General Hepke
 Peter Whitney as Bachman
 Claude Akin as Winkler
 John Doucette as Bos'n
 Alan Lee as Brounck

Cast notes:
It was originally announced that the Australian actor Michael Pate would play the ship's radio operator, but he does not appear in the final film.
In an unintentional parallel with her character Elsa in this film, actress Lana Turner had several relationships with men and was married seven times.

Production
Warner Bros bought the film rights to the novel, which was published in 1948, and John Wayne was announced for the lead in June 1951, with Bolton Mallory reported to be working on the script. Soon after, James Warner Bellah was announced as working on the script.

Production of the film was delayed for a while. In August 1953 John Farrow, who had made Hondo with Wayne, signed as director. Frank Nugent rewrote the script. Filming finally began in September 1954.  MGM loaned Lana Turner to the production for this film.

John Wayne later said Farrow "didn't really have a great deal to do with" Hondo because it was a Batjac production and "Everything was set up before he came on it. But he did direct Sea Chase and prove to me that he should not be put in charge of a producer-director position. He failed to tell the good story that was in the book. But now, we're talking about a matter of opinion and that's only my opinion. For some, he may be considered a fine director."

Although both the Caribbean Sea and the coastline of Mexico were considered as shooting locations, some parts of the film were shot in the waters around the Hawaiian Islands.

John Wayne came down with ear infections twice during the shooting of the film, and two other actors received infections due to skin diving.

The song that Lana Turner sings is "Steh' Ich im Finster Mitternacht", which is also known as "Treue Liebe". The German song had English lyrics written specifically for the film.

Factual basis
The script was adapted from a novel of the same name by Andrew Geer, which in turn was based on an incident involving the 1929-built German Norddeutscher Lloyd steamer Erlangen (6,100 tons). Under the captaincy of Alfred Grams, the freighter slipped out of Otago Harbour, New Zealand, on 28 August 1939, on the very eve of war, ostensibly for Port Kembla, New South Wales, where she was to have filled her coal bunkers for the homeward passage to Europe.

She then headed for the subantarctic Auckland Islands, where she successfully evaded the cruiser  and re-stocked with food and wood, cutting down large swathes of the Southern Rata forest. The freighter then made a desperate and successful escape—using jerry-rigged sails—to Ancud in southern Chile.

Though using the same basic plot as the film, the book painted Kirchner as the hero and Ehrlich as the villain, essentially swapping their roles; the book portrays Kirchner and Keller as unintended victims of Erlich's obsession, though in both stories, the key characters all appear to go down with the ship at the climax.

A  named  was built by Walkers Limited in Queensland in 1942 for the Royal Australian Navy. She operated in Australian and New Guinea waters during the later years of the Second World War, three years after the events depicted in the film.

See also

 List of American films of 1955
 List of World War II films
 John Wayne filmography

Notes

References

External links
 
 
 
 

1955 films
1955 drama films
American war drama films
Films based on American novels
Films directed by John Farrow
Films set in New Zealand
Films set in Chile
Films shot in Hawaii
Warner Bros. films
World War II naval films
Films scored by Roy Webb
CinemaScope films
1950s English-language films
1950s American films